Tarring a Boat (French - Le Bateau goudronné) is an 1873 painting by Édouard Manet, painted at Berck beach during one of his regular summer stays in Boulogne-sur-Mer. It shows the hull of a fishing boat being tarred. In it he used a darker palette than usual, typical of his work of that period. It is now in the Barnes Foundation in Philadelphia.

References

1873 paintings
Paintings by Édouard Manet
Collection of the Barnes Foundation
Ships in art